Nizhnyaya Yazva is a rural locality (a village) in Krasnovishersky District, Perm Krai, Russia. The population was 69 as of 2010. There are 3 streets.

Geography 
Nizhnyaya Yazva is located 23 km southwest of Krasnovishersk (the district's administrative centre) by road. Kotomysh is the nearest rural locality.

References 

Rural localities in Krasnovishersky District